Vladimer Gruzdevi (born 2 July 1952) is a Georgian sailor. He competed at the 1992 Summer Olympics and the 1996 Summer Olympics.

References

External links
 

1952 births
Living people
Male sailors (sport) of Georgia (country)
Olympic sailors of the Unified Team
Olympic sailors of Georgia (country)
Sailors at the 1992 Summer Olympics – Star
Sailors at the 1996 Summer Olympics – Star
Sportspeople from Mariupol